The Canton of Hornoy-le-Bourg  is a former canton situated in the department of the Somme and in the Picardie region of northern France. It was disbanded following the French canton reorganisation which came into effect in March 2015. It consisted of 16 communes, which joined the canton of Poix-de-Picardie in 2015. It had 5,803 inhabitants (2012).

Geography 
The canton was organised around the commune of Hornoy-le-Bourg in the arrondissement of Amiens. The altitude varies from 48m at Belloy-Saint-Léonard to 211m at Beaucamps-le-Jeune for an average of 161m.

The canton comprised 16 communes:

Arguel
Aumont
Beaucamps-le-Jeune
Beaucamps-le-Vieux
Belloy-Saint-Léonard
Brocourt
Dromesnil
Hornoy-le-Bourg
Lafresguimont-Saint-Martin
Liomer
Méricourt-en-Vimeu
Le Quesne
Saint-Germain-sur-Bresle
Thieulloy-l'Abbaye
Villers-Campsart
Vraignes-lès-Hornoy

Population

See also
 Arrondissements of the Somme department
 Cantons of the Somme department
 Communes of the Somme department

References

Hornoy-le-Bourg
2015 disestablishments in France
States and territories disestablished in 2015